The 1992 GP Ouest-France was the 56th edition of the GP Ouest-France cycle race and was held on 30 August 1992. The race started and finished in Plouay. The race was won by Ronan Pensec of the RMO team.

General classification

References

1992
1992 in road cycling
1992 in French sport